Malé Chyndice is a village and municipality in the Nitra District in western central Slovakia, in the Nitra Region.

History
In historical records the village was first mentioned in 1113.

Geography
The village lies at an altitude of 144 metres and covers an area of 7,89 km². It has a population of about 381 people.

Ethnicity
The village is approximately 99% Slovak.

Facilities
The village has a public library a gym and football pitch.

References

External links
https://web.archive.org/web/20070513023228/http://www.statistics.sk/mosmis/eng/run.html

Villages and municipalities in Nitra District